Mafia is the debut studio album by Romanian hip hop group B.U.G. Mafia, released September 20, 1995 on local Bucharest-based label Amma Sound. Production for the album was handled by group member and founder Tataee, with various composers and keyboardists giving co-production.  Heavily influenced by N.W.A. and Bone Thugs-n-Harmony. The album's horrorcore sound was influenced by Gravediggaz and Ganksta N-I-P

It had 15 tracks and featured guest performances from M&G, Marijuana, Vlad "Ben" Blându and actress Rona Hartner. Tataee has stated that he considers the album the group's worst release. The album sold 5000 copies upon its release

Track listing
"A fost odată ..."
"Copiii focului"
"La 2 metri în pământ"
"Aaaah!... Ooooh!..." (skit)
"Bairam de cartier" (feat. M&G)
"Viață de borfaș"
"C.O.D."
"Psihopatu'" 
"B.U.G. Mafia"
"Raid mafiot"
"O noapte grea"
"Ucigaș
"Înc'o cruce'n cimitir" (feat. Marijuana)
"Respect"
"1 Număr, 2 Numere, 3 Numere... Gata!?"

References

External links
 Mafia at Discogs

B.U.G. Mafia albums
1995 debut albums